James Kenneth Price (May 27, 1931 – August 4, 1987) was an American country music singer, songwriter, and actor. Nicknamed the "Round Mound of Sound," Price recorded for the Boone and RCA Victor, MRC and Dimension record labels, charting thirty-four singles on the Hot Country Songs charts between 1966 and 1980. His highest-peaking singles, "Walking on New Grass" and "Happy Tracks," both reached No. 7 on that chart.

Life and career
Price was born in Florence, Kentucky, United States, and was raised on a farm in Boone County, Kentucky.  He learned to play guitar when he was five years old. From 1952 until 1954, Price served in the U.S. Army during the Korean War, reaching the rank of corporal.  While stationed in Korea, he auditioned for a USO show, and before being discharged, he had decided to become a professional musician.  He studied for a brief time at the Cincinnati College-Conservatory of Music and became a musician on Midwestern Hayride on WLWT, eventually taking over as the show's host until it went off the air in the early 1970s.

He first recorded for Boone Records, then moved on to RCA Records in 1969, where he stayed until 1976.  For most of his career, Price worked with Ray Pennington, whose style complemented his own. Price had 34 singles chart in his career, including "Walking on the New Grass" (a top 10 hit in 1966), "Happy Tracks", "Northeast Arkansas Mississippi County Bootlegger" (a top 20 hit in 1969),. and "The Sheriff of Boone County" (which hit the Country top 10). A 1970 novelty song he co-wrote with his producer Ronny Light, a B-side single called "The Shortest Song in the World"- which clocked in at a mere eighteen seconds long, enjoyed some airplay in 1970.

Standing 6'-6" tall and weighing nearly 300 pounds for most of his professional career, he was nicknamed "The Round Mound of Sound", and wrote a song by the same name in 1968. Many of his comedic songs made reference to his size — "The Heavyweight" is an obvious example. In later years, Price became significantly thinner and lampooned himself in the song "The Boone County Weight Watchers of America".

In 1975, Price relocated to Nashville, and after a few uncredited appearances became a regular on Hee Haw.  He remained with the show until his death. He served as the bass vocalist for the Hee Haw Gospel Quartet, which included Grandpa Jones, Buck Owens, and Roy Clark.  Price and fellow Hee Haw cast member Lulu Roman got their own short-lived spin-off series called Hee Haw Honeys, which ran from 1978 to 1979.  Price and Roman guest starred on two episodes of The Love Boat.  He later had a small role in the film Cold Justice, which was released after his death.

His wife, Donna Price, wrote a few memorable tunes for him, including the hit "Let's Truck Together", which was used in a late 70s Hee Haw skit.  In the mid-1980s, Kenny and Donna starred in The Nashville Network (now Paramount Network) travelogue series called Wish You Were Here, where they traveled across the United States in a RV and visited places of interest.
 
Price died of a heart attack in Florence, Kentucky, at the age of 56.

Discography

Albums

Singles

A"The Sheriff of Boone County" also peaked at No. 19 on Bubbling Under Hot 100.

References

External links

1931 births
1987 deaths
American country singer-songwriters
American male singer-songwriters
RCA Victor artists
People from Florence, Kentucky
Country musicians from Kentucky
20th-century American singers
Singer-songwriters from Kentucky
20th-century American comedians
20th-century American male singers